The .400 Purdey, also known as the .400 3-inch Straight and .400 Purdey Light Express 3-inch, is an obsolete rifle cartridge developed by James Purdey & Sons.

Design
The .400 Purdey is a rimmed straight walled centerfire rifle cartridge intended for use in single shot and double rifles.

History
In Britain, from the inception of breech-loading rifles there were a large number of straight black powder  paper and coiled brass cartridges developed of varying case lengths from 2 to 3 inches.  Around 1905, Purdey loaded the 3 inch brass cartridge with a light cordite load to create this cartridge.  Unusually for a proprietary cartridge, the .400 Purdey was introduced as a "Nitro for Black" loading, typically a mild loading of smokeless powder for a Black Powder Express cartridge, carefully balanced through trial to replicate the ballistics of the black powder version.

Use
The .400 Purdey was reasonably popular in India for deer, boar and even tiger, and was available in both double rifles and more reasonably priced Martini action sporting rifles.  Whilst obsolete, cartridges can still be purchased today from manufacturers such as Kynoch.

See also
List of rifle cartridges
10 mm rifle cartridges

References

External links
 Ammo-One, "400 Purdey", ammo-one.com, retrieved 18 April 2017.
 Cartridgecollector, "400 Purdey Light Express 3 inch", cartridgecollector.net, retrieved 18 April 2017.
 The Spanish Association of Cartridge Collectors, ".400 Purdey", municion.org , retrieved 18 April 2017.

Pistol and rifle cartridges
British firearm cartridges
James Purdey & Sons cartridges